is a Japanese football player. He played for Blaublitz Akita.

Club statistics
Updated to 27 November 2021.

Honours
 Blaublitz Akita
 J3 League (2): 2017, 2020

References

External links
Profile at Blaublitz Akita

1993 births
Living people
Hosei University alumni
Association football people from Shizuoka Prefecture
Japanese footballers
J3 League players
Blaublitz Akita players
Association football midfielders